Sesame Street Fever is a concept album made by the cast of Sesame Street in 1978. It follows the characters as a love of disco sweeps Sesame Street.

The album heavily parodies Saturday Night Fever, and the cover features Grover where John Travolta should be, and Ernie, Bert, and Cookie Monster in the place of the Bee Gees.

Bee Gee Robin Gibb also appears on the album, and according to the LP's liner notes, "appears courtesy of his children Melissa and Spencer Gibb".

The recording was released in the LP, cassette, and eight-track audio formats; it has never been commercially released on compact disc (except for a 1991 Japanese re-release) but is available to download on Amazon, iTunes and file sharing sites. Singles of "Sesame Street Fever"/"Trash" and "Doin' the Pigeon"/"Rubber Duckie" were released as promotional items.

A follow-up album, Sesame Disco! was released in 1979.

Track listing
 "Sesame Street Fever" by Robin Gibb, Bert, Count von Count, Big Bird, Ernie, Cookie Monster
 "Doin' The Pigeon" - Bert & The Girls (preceded by a short hidden track that features Bert and Ernie debating the dance craze)
 "Rubber Duckie" - Ernie & His Rubber Duckie
 "Trash" - Robin Gibb
 "C Is For Cookie" - Cookie Monster & The Girls (preceded by a conversation between Cookie Monster and Robin Gibb)
 "Has Anybody Seen My Dog?" - Marty & Grover (Cookie Monster makes a brief cameo.)
Both "Doin' The Pigeon" and "Has Anybody Seen My Dog?" have overextended instrumental outros (the former's is broken up with one more singing of the chorus by the girls), possibly to help pad the album's sides.

Personnel
Robin Gibb – vocals
Frank Oz – vocals
Jerry Nelson – vocals
Caroll Spinney – vocals
Jim Henson – vocals
Maeretha Stewart – vocals
Ullanda McCullough – vocals
Yvonne Lewis – vocals
Jack Cavari – guitar
Jeff Layton – guitar
Cliff Morris – guitar
Herb Bushler – bass guitar
Richard Crooks – drums
David Horowitz – keyboards
Pat Rebillot – keyboards
George Devons – percussion
Jimmy Maelen – conga
Joe Shepley – trumpet
Alan Raph – trombone
Lou Marini – single-reed instruments
Dave Tofani – baritone saxophone
Paul Gershman – strings
Harold Kohon – strings
Joe Malin – strings
Gene Orloff – strings
Matt Raimondi – strings
Gerald Tarack – strings
Jesse Levy – cello
Kermit Moore – cello
Michael DeLugg - engineer

Chart performance
The album ended up being a surprise commercial success both in terms of chart performance and sales. It peaked at #75 on Billboard's Pop Albums Chart, and was certified Gold by the RIAA.

See also
Sesame Street discography

References

Disco soundtracks
Sesame Street albums
1978 albums
Concept albums
Disco albums by American artists